Câmpulung Moldovenesc (formerly spelled Cîmpulung Moldovenesc) is a city in Suceava County, northeastern Romania. It is situated in the historical region of Bukovina.

Câmpulung Moldovenesc is the fourth largest urban settlement in the county, with a population of 16,105 inhabitants, according to the 2011 census. It was declared a municipality in 1995, along with two other towns in Suceava County, more specifically Fălticeni and Rădăuți.

Other names 

The town is also known as Moldovahosszúmező in Hungarian, Kimpulung Moldovanesk (Кимпулунг Молдованеск) or Dovhopillja (Довгопілля) in Ukrainian and Kimpulung Mołdawski in Polish.

Administration and local politics

Town council 

The town's current local council has the following political composition, according to the results of the 2020 Romanian local elections:

Geography 

Câmpulung Moldovenesc is situated in the region of Bukovina, in north-eastern Romania. The city is located in the mountain area of Obcinele Bucovinei, on the banks of the Moldova River.

Câmpulung Moldovenesc is accessible by both car and train. The European route E58, that links the region of Moldavia with Transylvania, crosses the city. There are two railway stations located in the city: Câmpulung Moldovenesc in the city center and Câmpulung Est in Capu Satului neighborhood.

There are many places of interest located in and around Câmpulung Moldovenesc, such as Rarău and Giumalău, which at 1650 meters and 1857 meters are the highest peaks in the region. One can also enjoy the forests which surround Câmpulung Moldovenesc or visit a monastery in one of the nearby villages.

History 

The first written mention of the village of Câmpulung Moldovenesc dates back to April 14, 1411. At that time the ruling prince of Moldavia was Alexandru cel Bun. Dimitrie Cantemir, in his well-known work Descriptio Moldaviae, mentions Ocolul Câmpulung, an autonomous region in northern Moldavia that has its own rules and leaders. This region consisted of 15 villages. During the Late Middle Ages, exactly as the medieval town of Suceava, Câmpulung Moldovenesc had operated under the Magdeburg law.

Together with the rest of Bukovina, Câmpulung Moldovenesc was under the rule of the Habsburg monarchy (later Austria-Hungary) from 1775 to 1918. Câmpulung was in the Austrian part of the empire after the compromise of 1867, head of the district with the same name, one of the 9 Bezirkshauptmannschaften in Bukovina province. Other main district cities were Dorna Watra (Vatra Dornei) and Wama (Vama) in 1900.

Later, between 1925 and 1950, Câmpulung Moldovenesc was the capital of the former Câmpulung County, the most extensive county in Bukovina. The spa and ski resort Vatra Dornei was the second most important town in Câmpulung County. Following the administrative reforms implemented by the communist regime in 1950, the city became part of Suceava Region, while in 1968 it became part of Suceava County.

Culture 

Câmpulung Moldovenesc has the Wooden Spoons Museum, a museum that displays the wooden spoons collection of the deceased history professor Ion Țugui.

Demographics 

Câmpulung Moldovenesc reached its peak population in 1992, when more than 22,000 people were living within the city limits. As of 2016, the town of Câmpulung Moldovenesc is the fourth largest urban settlement in Suceava County, after the county capital, Suceava, and the larger towns of Rădăuți and Fălticeni.

At the 2011 census, Câmpulung Moldovenesc had a population of 16,105 inhabitants as follows: 99.08% of inhabitants were ethnic Romanians, 0.25% Germans (Bukovina Germans), 0.22% Roma, 0.17% Ukrainians, and 0.09% Hungarians.

Economy 

The main industries in Câmpulung Moldovenesc are dairy products, lumber, and ecotourism. Part of the city inhabitants works in agriculture and bovine growth.

"Câmpulung" means "Long Field" in Romanian. Moldovenesc ("Moldavian") is used to differentiate between this city and Câmpulung Muscel (Argeș County, Wallachia).

Natives 

 Maria Diaconescu (born 1937) - javelin thrower;
 Vasile Gheorghiu (1872–1959) - theology professor, academician;
 Marian Kielec (born 1942), Polish footballer;
 Leibu Levin (1914–1983) - narrator of Yiddish literature, singer and composer;
 Anca Parghel (1957–2008) - jazz singer, musician;
 Daniel Popescu (born 1981) - politician;
 Ion Ștefureac (1871–1920) - professor, architect.

Gallery

References

External links 

  Câmpulung Moldovenesc Town Hall official site
  Ştefan cel Mare Military High School, Câmpulung Moldovenesc
  Dragoş Vodă National High School, Câmpulung Moldovenesc
  Bucovina Forestry High School, Câmpulung Moldovenesc
  Suceava County site - Câmpulung Moldovenesc web page
  Photo Gallery - Old photos of Câmpulung Moldovenesc
  Kimpolung-Bukovina Jewish Community

 
Cities in Romania
Bukovina-German people
Jewish communities in Romania
Duchy of Bukovina
Localities in Southern Bukovina
Capitals of former Romanian counties
Ținutul Suceava
Populated places in Suceava County